The First Ecumenical Council of the Vatican, commonly known as the First Vatican Council or Vatican I, was convoked by Pope Pius IX on 29 June 1868, after four years of planning and preparation. It opened on 8 December 1869 and was adjourned on 20 October 1870 after the Capture of Rome. This was the 20th ecumenical council of the Catholic Church, held three centuries after the Council of Trent, Unlike the five earlier general councils held in Rome, which met in the Lateran Basilica and are known as Lateran councils, it met in Saint Peter's Basilica in the Vatican, hence its name. Its best-known decision is its definition of papal infallibility.

The council was convoked to respond to the rising influence of rationalism, liberalism, and materialism. Its purpose was, besides this, to define the Catholic doctrine concerning the Church of Christ. There was discussion and approval of only two constitutions: the Dogmatic Constitution on the Catholic Faith and the First Dogmatic Constitution on the Church of Christ, the latter dealing with the primacy (supremacy) and infallibility of the Bishop of Rome. The first matter brought up for debate was the dogmatic draft of Catholic doctrine against what it considered as the manifold errors due to rationalism. The council condemned rationalism, anarchism, communism, socialism, liberalism, materialism, modernism, naturalism, pantheism, and secularism. The Catholic Church was on the defensive against the main philosophical trends of the 19th century. Another main goal of the council was to define the powers and role of the pope.

Background 
As early as late 1864, Pope Pius IX had commissioned the cardinals resident in Rome to tender him their opinions as to the advisability of a council. The majority pronounced in favour of the scheme, dissenting voices being rare. After March 1865 the convocation of the council was no longer in doubt. Special bulls were reportedly issued with invitations to Eastern Orthodox and Protestant clerics as well as to other non-Catholics, but apparently none accepted the invitations.

The council was summoned by the pope by a bull on 29 June 1868. The first session was held in St. Peter's Basilica on 8 December 1869. Preliminary sessions dealt with general administrative matters and committee assignments. Bishop Bernard John McQuaid complained of rainy weather, inadequate heating facilities, and boredom. Bishop James Roosevelt Bayley of Newark, New Jersey, noted the high prices in Rome. When Lord Houghton asked Cardinal Manning what had been going on, he answered: "Well, we meet, and we look at one another, and then we talk a little, but when we want to know what we have been doing, we read The Times".

Papal infallibility 

The object of the council was a mystery for a while. It claimed, as the view of many Catholics in France, that the council would be of very brief duration, since the majority of its members were in agreement, and mentioned  the proclamation of papal infallibility. Factions around the proposal arose across Europe, and some Italians even proposed setting up a rival council in Naples. However, before the council met all became quiet in view of the studied vagueness of the invitation.

Pope Pius defined as dogma the Immaculate Conception of Mary, the mother of Jesus, in 1854. However, the proposal to define papal infallibility itself as dogma met with resistance, not because of doubts about the substance of the proposed definition, but because some considered it inopportune to take that step at that time. Richard McBrien divides the bishops attending Vatican I into three groups. The first group, which McBrien calls the "active infallibilists", was led by Henry Edward Manning and Ignatius von Senestrey. According to McBrien, the majority of the bishops were not so much interested in a formal definition of papal infallibility as they were in strengthening papal authority and, because of this, were willing to accept the agenda of the infallibilists. A minority, some 10% of the bishops, McBrien says, opposed the proposed definition of papal infallibility on both ecclesiastical and pragmatic grounds, because, in their opinion, it departed from the ecclesiastical structure of the early Christian church. From a pragmatic perspective, they feared that defining papal infallibility would alienate some Catholics, create new difficulties for union with non-Catholics, and provoke interference by governments in ecclesiastical affairs. Those who held this view included most of the German and Austro-Hungarian bishops, nearly half of the Americans, one third of the French, most of the Chaldaeans and Melkites, and a few Armenians. Only a few bishops appear to have had doubts about the dogma itself.

On 24 April 1870, the dogmatic constitution on the Catholic faith  was adopted unanimously. The draft presented to the council on 8 March drew no serious criticism, but a group of 35 English-speaking bishops, who feared that the opening phrase of the first chapter, "" ('Holy Roman Catholic Church'), might be construed as favouring the Anglican branch theory, later succeeded in having an additional adjective inserted, so that the final text read: "" ('Holy Catholic Apostolic Roman Church'). The constitution thus set forth the teaching of the "Holy Catholic Apostolic Roman Church" on God, revelation and faith.

There was stronger opposition to the draft constitution on the nature of the church, which at first did not include the question of papal infallibility, but the majority party in the council, whose position on this matter was much stronger, brought it forward. It was decided to postpone discussion of everything in the draft except infallibility. The decree did not go forward without controversy; Cardinal , Archbishop of Bologna, proposed adding that the pope is assisted by "the counsel of the bishops manifesting the tradition of the churches". Pius IX rejected Guidi's view of the bishops as witnesses to the tradition, maintaining: "I am the tradition".

On 13 July 1870, a preliminary vote on the section on infallibility was held in a general congregation: 451 voted simply in favour, 88 against, and 62 in favour but on condition of some amendment. This made evident what the final outcome would be, and some 60 members of the opposition left Rome so as not to be associated with approval of the document. The two votes in opposition were cast by Bishops Aloisio Riccio and Edward Fitzgerald.

The dogmatic constitution states, in chapter 4:9, that the pope has "full and supreme power of jurisdiction over the whole Church" (chapter 3:9); and that, when he:

None of the bishops who had argued that proclaiming the definition was inopportune refused to accept it. Some Catholics, mainly of German language and largely inspired by the historian Ignaz von Döllinger, formed the separate Old Catholic Church in protest; von Döllinger did not formally join the new group himself.

Suspension and aftermath 

Discussion of the rest of the document on the nature of the church was to continue when the bishops returned after a summer break. However, in the meanwhile the Franco-Prussian War broke out. With the swift German advance and the capture of Emperor Napoleon III, French troops protecting papal rule in Rome withdrew from the city.

Consequently, on 20 October 1870, one month after the newly founded Kingdom of Italy had occupied Rome, Pope Pius IX, who then considered himself a prisoner in the Vatican, issued the bull , adjourning the council indefinitely. While some proposed to continue the council in the Belgian city of Mechlin, it was never reconvened. The council was formally closed in 1960 by Pope John XXIII, prior to the formation of the Second Vatican Council.

Meanwhile, in reaction to the political implications of the doctrine of infallibility on the sovereignity of secular states, some of the European kingdoms and republics took rapid action against the Catholic Church. The Austrian Empire annulled the Concordat arranged with the Roman Curia in 1855. In the Kingdom of Prussia, the anti-Catholic Kulturkampf broke out immediately afterwards, and in the French Third Republic the synod so accentuated the power of ultramontanism (an emphasis on the powers of the pope), that Republican France took steps to curb it by revoking the Concordat of 1801, and therefore completely separating the Church from the State.

Controversies and opposition 
The dogma of papal infallibility raised considerable opposition in some liberal theological circles in the Netherlands, Austria, Germany and Switzerland; the most notable theologian opposing the new dogma was Ignaz von Döllinger, who was excommunicated in 1871 by Archbishop Gregor von Scherr of Munich and Freising, for refusing to accept the council's decision.

Old Catholic schism 
Following the council's decision, a minority of clergy and laity opposed to the newly proclaimed dogma united with the Jansenists, which had maintained a somewhat precarious existence in separation from Rome since the 18th century but had preserved an episcopal succession recognized by Rome as valid though illicit. The first consecration of the new order was that of Joseph H. Reinkens, who was made bishop in Germany by a sympathetic Jansenist bishop Johannes Heykamp of Utrecht. Such new group referred to itself as the Old Catholic Church (or the Christian Catholic Church in Switzerland). Old Catholics in Europe united into the Union of Utrecht in 1889, which entered into full communion with the Anglican Communion in 1931 through the Bonn Agreement.

The Union of Utrecht still exists to this day and includes the Old Catholic Church of the Netherlands, the Catholic Diocese of the Old Catholics in Germany, the Old Catholic Church of Austria, the Old Catholic Church of the Czech Republic and the Polish-Catholic Church of the Republic of Poland. The Union of Scranton, formed by more theologically conservative Old Catholics, was formed in 2008 and currently includes the Polish National Catholic Church and the Nordic Catholic Church.

See also 
 Second Vatican Council

References

Notes

Bibliography 

 
 
 
 

 Hales, E. E. Y. "The First Vatican Council." Studies in Church History 7 (1971): 329-344. online
 
 Hennesey, James. "National Traditions and the First Vatican Council." Archivum Historiae Pontificiae (1969): 491-512. [https://www.jstor.org/stable/23563715 online\

 
 
 
 
 

  This contains a detailed account of the course of the Council, and some commentary on the immediate political impact.

 O'Malley, John W. Vatican I: the council and the making of the ultramontane church (Harvard University Press, 2018).

Further reading 

 
 
 Hales, E. E. Y. Pio Nono (1954) biography of Pope Pius IX; online
 
 
 Hoppen, K. Theodore. "First Vatican Council, 1869-70" History Today (Oct 1969), Vol. 19 Issue 10, p713-720 online

 Kadić, Ante. "Bishop Strossmayer and the First Vatican Council."  Slavonic and East European Review 49.116 (1971): 382-409. online; he played a major role. 
 Noether, Emiliana P. "Vatican Council I: Its Political and Religious Setting." Journal of Modern History 40.2 (1968): 218-233. online.

 Portier, William L. "The First Vatican Council, John Henry Newman, and the Making of a Post-Christendom Church." Newman Studies Journal 17.1 (2020): 123-144. excerpt

 
 Raymond, John. "The First Vatican Council 1869-1870." History Today (Nov 1962) 12#11 pp 759–767. online.
 Verhoeven, Timothy. "Transatlantic Connections: American Anti-Catholicism and the First Vatican Council (1869–70)."  Catholic Historical Review 100.4 (2014): 695-720. Anti-Catholics were outraged. excerpt
 Wallace, L. P. The Papacy and European Diplomacy, 1869-1878 (U North Carlina Press, 1948)

External links 

 Text of the council's ruling

 
1870 disestablishments
Vatican 1
Vatican I
Religious organizations established in 1869
Vatican 1
Pope Pius IX
1869 conferences
1870 conferences
1869 in Christianity
1870 in Christianity
1869 establishments in the Papal States